Miss Namibia 2009 was held on June 7, 2009 in Windhoek, Namibia. The winner represented Namibia in Miss Universe 2009 and Miss World 2009. 10 contestants competed for crown. The first runner up entered in Miss International 2009. The second runner up entered in Miss Earth 2009. This is the first edition that they acquired the license for Miss International and Miss Earth.

Results

Special Awards
Miss Friendship - Daniella Filipovic (Swakopmund)
Miss Photogenic - Theodora Amutjira (Erongo Region)
Best Face - (Khomas Region)
Miss Internet - (Khomas Region)
Miss Congeniality - Selma Usiku (Oshikoto Region)

Contestants

External links
Official Website
New Miss Namibia 2009

2009
2009 beauty pageants
2009 in Namibia